Stiria is a genus of moths of the family Noctuidae. The genus was erected by Augustus Radcliffe Grote in 1874.

Species
Stiria blanchardi (Hogue, 1966) western Texas, southeastern New Mexico
Stiria colimae Draudt, 1927 Mexico
Stiria consuela Strecker, 1900 Arizona
Stiria dyari Hill, 1924 southern California, northern Baja California, Arizona, southern Nevada
Stiria intermixta Dyar, 1918 Mexico, west Texas, Arizona, New Mexico, Utah, Colorado
Stiria ischune Dyar, 1912 Mexico
Stiria iticys Dyar, 1914 Mexico
Stiria mouris Dyar, 1912 Mexico
Stiria ruficeps Draudt, 1927 Mexico
Stiria rugifrons Grote, 1874 from (Florida-Virginia)- to (Ohio, Indiana, Illinois), Saskatchewan, Alberta, Wyoming, Rocky Mountains, Colorado, Texas
Stiria satana Poole, 1995 Arizona
Stiria sisaya Dyar, 1912 Mexico
Stiria sulphurea Neumoegen, 1882 western Texas, New Mexico, Arizona
Stiria tachymora Dyar, 1914 Mexico

References

Stiriinae